The South Korean boy band Enhypen has released two studio albums, three extended plays, and five singles and made eight soundtrack appearances.

Albums

Studio albums

Reissues

Extended plays

Singles

Promotional singles

Soundtrack appearances

Other charted songs

Videography

Music videos

Other videos

DVD

Notes

References

Enhypen albums
Discographies of South Korean artists
K-pop music group discographies